The Raid on Richmond was a series of British military actions against the capital of Virginia, Richmond, and the surrounding area, during the American Revolutionary War. Led by American turncoat Benedict Arnold, the Richmond Campaign is considered one of his greatest successes while serving under the British Army, and one of the most notorious actions that Arnold ever performed.

Background
The British general Sir Henry Clinton hoped that sending an American-born commander to Richmond would convince more Loyalists in the area to join the British cause, which would subsequently give the British Army the upper hand in the Southern Theatre of the war.

Prior to the beginning of the raid, Thomas Jefferson, the then-Governor of Virginia, had moved the capital of Virginia from Williamsburg to Richmond, because of its strategically central, defensible location. In the event of an attack, Jefferson moved all of the town's military supplies to a foundry five miles outside of Richmond. Little did Jefferson know how big of an attack would soon follow.

The Richmond Campaign
From the 1st to the 3rd of January, Arnold's fleet sailed up the James River, laying waste to plantations and settlements along the way. On 4 January, the British reached Westover Plantation, where they would ready themselves for the assault against Richmond. In the afternoon, Arnold and his men disembarked on foot towards Richmond.

The following day, Arnold's force of Loyalist "green-coats", consisting of infantry, dragoons, and artillery, arrived at Richmond, which was defended by about 200 militiamen. Surprisingly enough, most Virginia militiamen had not bothered to defend their capital because they had already served their time in battle, and thought that their duty was up. Upon seeing the group of Virginia militiamen, Colonel John Graves Simcoe, of the Queen's Rangers, ordered a detachment of soldiers to confront them. The militiamen fired a weak musket volley at the advancing British, and then broke and ran into the woods, with the Loyalist detachment chasing after them. Jefferson, seeing his militiamen dispersed, and no other plausible way to defend Richmond, quickly ordered the mass-evacuation of most military supplies from the city, and promptly fled in his carriage, along with the rest of Virginia's government officials and his family.

At noon, Arnold's forces marched triumphantly into the city, described by an eyewitness as "undisturbed by even a single shot." From his headquarters at Main Street's City Tavern (he would only stay in Richmond for a day), Arnold wrote a letter to Jefferson, saying that if he could move the city's tobacco stores and military arms to his ships, he would leave Richmond unharmed. Jefferson's response was livid, refusing that a turncoat do anything to Richmond's supplies.

Upon receiving the letter the next day on January 6, Arnold was enraged, and ordered Richmond to be set to the torch. British troops then started a rampage across the city, burning government buildings as well as private homes, ransacking the city of its valuables and supplies. A strong wind spread the flames even more, adding to the destruction. After most of Richmond was burned and its valuables sacked, Arnold led his forces outside of Richmond and to the Westham cannon foundry, which held even more armaments, and proceeded to burn it down. After its destruction, the British went down to the port town of Warwick (across the James river, in Chesterfield County), and began another spree of violence, burning down homes and looting buildings.

When the news of Richmond's destruction reached Jefferson, he was aghast. Arnold's British force had entered Virginia's very capital, unopposed, and had singlehandedly defiled it. The Governor called his friend, Sampson Mathews, the Colonel of the Virginia militia, and ordered him to assault Arnold's forces. Mathews built up a group of around 200 militiamen, and embarked hastily to catch and damage Arnold's slow-moving army near Richmond.

Eventually, delayed by bad weather, sickness and mutiny, Mathews' forces caught up with Arnold's army, and attacked it by surprise. Using nimble tactics popularized by American commander Nathanael Greene, the militiamen managed to inflict significant casualties on Arnold's army, and over the following days, the British ranks were thinned by multiple skirmishes around Richmond and the James River. Eventually, Arnold considered the skirmishes between his American Legion and the Patriots to be so serious, that he ordered his army to retreat to Portsmouth, in order to set up defensive fortifications there and wait for reinforcements.

Thus, the British army moved quickly down the James River, burning more plantations and homes in their wake, while still being chased by Mathews. One of the plantations that Arnold's men burned on their retreat was that of Berkeley Plantation, the home of Founding Father Benjamin Harrison V. Harrison was going about his regular duties in his mansion, when he saw the British force advancing towards his plantation. He quickly informed his wife and children, and they then escaped in a carriage. Arnold knew that Berkeley belonged to Harrison, whom he viewed as a traitor, and wanted to punish him for treason against Great Britain. All of the Harrison family's portraits and artwork were taken outside and 40 of Harrison's slaves were confiscated. Arnold spared Harrison's mansion and houses, however, as he believed the war would soon be won by the British, and desired a grand plantation in which to live after the war. The only original portrait of Harrison to survive was the miniature around his wife's neck, wearing it as she fled from the British forces.

On January 19, the Richmond Campaign ended, when Benedict Arnold's weary troops reached Portsmouth. They had survived a great ordeal, and Arnold was praised by local Loyalists, as well as his superiors, to be a hero. On the same day, General William Phillips arrived to relieve Arnold with 2,000 fresh troops, and to assume command over Portsmouth's defenses. Even though days of turmoil had ended, they would live on as some of Benedict Arnold's finest hours.

Aftermath
The destruction of Richmond, one of the most important cities in the United States, outraged the American populace. George Washington was so angered and humiliated by the destruction of Richmond, that he put a 5,000 guinea bounty on Arnold's head and ordered his aide, the Marquis de Lafayette, to hang Arnold if he encountered him in battle. Continental marksmen were issued targets painted in Benedict's appearance to practice on, if in the event they saw him.

The British, on the other hand saw Arnold's victory at Richmond as a turning point, and gave them hopes that Loyalists could rise up with them, and quell the American presence in the South. Many slaves were liberated from the raided plantations, as well as Richmond itself, and many of them promptly joined the British Army afterwards, in exchange for their freedom. After Arnold's initial raid on the James River and the area around Richmond, more minor raids ensued. British commanders like William Phillips and Banastre Tarleton followed in Arnold's example, raiding and burning more outlying towns and preying on Continental troops. Benedict Arnold, the Continental Army's brilliant General, had guaranteed himself a place in the British ranks with the Richmond Campaign.

See also
 American Revolutionary War § War in the South. Places ' Raid of Richmond ' in overall sequence and strategic context.

References

History of Richmond, Virginia
Richmond
Richmond
Richmond
1781 in Virginia
Richmond